is a railway station in the city of Chita, Aichi, Japan, operated by Meitetsu.

Lines

Station layout
The station has dual opposed side platforms connected by an underground passage. The station is unattended.

Platforms

Adjacent stations

Station history
Nagaura Station was opened on September 1, 1930, as a station on the Aichi Electric Railway Company. The Aichi Electric Railway became part of the Meitetsu group on August 1, 1935.  The station has been unattended since September 1970. In January 2005, the Tranpass system of magnetic fare cards with automatic turnstiles was implemented, and the station has been unattended since that point.

Passenger statistics
In fiscal 2017, the station was used by an average of 1,005 passengers daily (boarding passengers only).

Surrounding area
The station is located in a residential area.

See also
 List of Railway Stations in Japan

References

External links

 Official web page 

Railway stations in Japan opened in 1930
Railway stations in Aichi Prefecture
Stations of Nagoya Railroad
Chita, Aichi